Palenin is a rural locality (a khutor) in Krivopolyanskoye Rural Settlement, Ostrogozhsky District, Voronezh Oblast, Russia. The population was 330 as of 2010. There are 6 streets.

Geography 
Palenin is located 31 km south of Ostrogozhsk (the district's administrative centre) by road. Krivaya Polyana is the nearest rural locality.

References 

Rural localities in Ostrogozhsky District